Johan Geirnaert (born 9 January 1951) is a Belgian long-distance runner. He competed in the marathon at the 1984 Summer Olympics.

References

1951 births
Living people
Athletes (track and field) at the 1984 Summer Olympics
Belgian male long-distance runners
Belgian male marathon runners
Olympic athletes of Belgium
Place of birth missing (living people)